Greatest Hits Radio UK is a DAB radio station serving the United Kingdom, as part of Bauer’s Greatest Hits Radio network.

The station launched on 7 January 2019. It relays Greatest Hits Radio North West programming but with UK wide news & information, traffic bulletins and advertising.

Availability
The station broadcasts across most of the UK on DAB (Digital Radio) using various local multiplexes.
Cambridge
Kent
Northants
North Cumbria
Northern Ireland
Oxfordshire
Peterborough
In June 2020, the station replaced Heat Radio on Freeview 716.

In December 2022, the station replaced Scala Radio on Sky 0151.

Programming
Greatest Hits Radio UK broadcasts from Bauer’s studios in Manchester, Liverpool and Birmingham, Edinburgh plus Bauer's Golden Square headquarters in Soho.

News 
Bauer’s Manchester newsroom broadcasts national news bulletins hourly from 6am to 7pm on weekdays and from 9am to 1pm on Saturdays and Sundays. Headlines are broadcast on the half-hour during weekday breakfast and drivetime shows, alongside national traffic bulletins.

At all other times, mainly evening and overnight, hourly national bulletins originate from Sky News Radio.

References

External links
Greatest Hits Radio UK

British radio networks
Bauer Radio
Bauer Group (UK)
Greatest Hits Radio
Radio stations in Manchester
Radio stations established in 2019